Hirewaddatti  is a village in the southern state of Karnataka, India. It is located in the Mundargi taluk of Gadag district in Karnataka.

Demographics
As of 2001 India census, Hirewaddatti had a population of 6529 with 3304 males and 3225 females.

See also
 Gadag
 Districts of Karnataka

References

External links
 http://Gadag.nic.in/

Villages in Gadag district